Ryan Gibson (born 22 January 1996) is an English cricketer who played for Yorkshire County Cricket Club. A right-arm medium bowler, Gibson has played one day cricket since June 2013, having progressed through the Yorkshire Under-14s, Yorkshire Under-15s and Yorkshire Under-17s into the Yorkshire Academy and  Yorkshire 2nd XI. He also plays for the England Under-19s.

Gibson is from Staithes, North Yorkshire, England and is a former pupil of Flying Hall School.

References

External links

1996 births
Yorkshire cricketers
People from Whitby
English cricketers
Living people
People educated at Fyling Hall School